Gururani is a surname / last name written by a small number of people from the Brahmin community of Kumaon region of the state of Uttarakhand, a northern state of India.

Origins
Gururanis used to write Kaushik as their surname before the name Gururani came into existence, and there is a small tale on the origins of this surname. According to this tale, the name "Gururani" originated when the rulers of Kumaon hired highly educated Brahmins (GURU) to provide education to the illiterate queens (RANI) of Kumaon.

Native Regions
Gururani is a family name for Brahmin caste mostly found in the region of Uttarakhand, Uttar Pradesh.

Gururani's are also found in Himachal, where a famous example of the surname is Birchand Gururani, after whom the city-forest of Bir is named.

With the Kumaoni diaspora spreading across the world, families with these surname are also found in the western nations.

Language
The native language of Gururani is Kumaoni, Devanagari.

See also
Kumaon
Kumaoni people
Kumaon Regiment

Indian surnames